William Johnson Sewell (April 11, 1916 – February 7, 1989) was an American football player and coach.

Sewell was born in England and moved with his family to Tacoma, Washington, in 1925.  He played college football for the Washington State Cougars football team.  During the 1940 season, he led the country in passing with 86 complete passes for 1,023 yards.  He also set a Washington State career record with 2,522 yards of total offense from 1939 to 1941.  He was selected by both the Associated Press and the Newspaper Enterprise Association as the third-team quarterback on the 1941 College Football All-America Team. Sewell was also a pitcher for the Washington State baseball team.

Sewell became Washington State's baseball coach in 1947 and an assistant football coach in 1948.  In 1949, he became the athletic director and athletic coach at Wenatchee Valley College,  From 1956 to 1976, he was the athletic director and coach at Coast Union High School in Cambria, California. He was inducted into the Washington State Athletics Hall of Fame in 1987.

References

1916 births
1989 deaths
American football quarterbacks
English players of American football
Second Air Force Superbombers football players
Washington State Cougars baseball coaches
Washington State Cougars baseball players
Washington State Cougars football coaches
Washington State Cougars football players
Junior college men's basketball coaches in the United States
Junior college football coaches in the United States
Players of American football from Tacoma, Washington
Baseball players from Tacoma, Washington
People from Egremont, Cumbria
Sportspeople from Cumbria
English emigrants to the United States